Olavi Salsola (Keuruu, 26 December 1933 - Rauma, 8 October 1995) was a Finnish male middle distance runner.

Biography
In a fantastic evening of 1957, in the Finnish city of Turku, there was an extraordinary event (but also a strange coincidence), for the sport of athletics. Three Finnish athletes have gone under the previous world record of 1500 meters, all three were called by first name Olavi and all three were born in 1933. For this reason, the three athletes are today remembered as  "the three Olavis".

World record
1500 metres: 3:40.2 -  Turku, 11 July 1957

Olympic results

See also
 1500 metres world record progression

References

External links
 
 Athlete profile from site Track and Field Statistics

1933 births
1995 deaths
World record setters in athletics (track and field)
Finnish male middle-distance runners
Olympic athletes of Finland
Athletes (track and field) at the 1956 Summer Olympics
People from Keuruu
Sportspeople from Central Finland